Derek Stewart (born 18 June 1948) is a retired amateur Scottish football wing half who played in the Scottish League for Queen's Park. He was capped by Scotland at amateur level.

References 

Scottish footballers
Scottish Football League players
Queen's Park F.C. players
Association football wing halves
Scotland amateur international footballers
Place of birth missing (living people)
1948 births
Living people
Glasgow University F.C. players